The Metastrongylidae are a family of nematodes.

Genera in the family Metastrongylidae include:

 Aelurostrongylus
Metastrongylus
Skrjabingylus

References

Strongylida
Nematode families